Michael P. Pratt (August 4, 1948 – June 16, 2022) was an American basketball player and coach. He was a 6'4" (1.93 m), 195 lb (88.5 kg) guard.

Born in Dayton, Ohio, Pratt attended Meadowdale High School, graduating in 1966. He then went on to the University of Kentucky where he was a three-year letter winner under legendary coach Adolph Rupp from 1967 through 1970. Following his career with the Wildcats he was selected in the 1970 American Basketball Association draft by the Kentucky Colonels, where he played two seasons and averaged six points per game.

Following his playing days he became an assistant coach under Lee Rose at UNC Charlotte (now known athletically as Charlotte), helping the 49ers to reach the 1977 NCAA Final Four. After Rose accepted the head coaching job at Purdue following the 1977–78 season, Pratt was chosen as his successor. Pratt coached the 49ers for four seasons, compiling a record of 55–52 before being relieved of his duties following the 1981–82 season.

Pratt did analysis on radio broadcasts of Kentucky men's basketball games.  In 2009, he was inducted into the University of Kentucky Athletics Hall of Fame.

Head coaching record

Footnotes

References

External links
ABA stats @ basketballreference.com
Mike Pratt stats at bigbluehistory.net

1948 births
2022 deaths
American men's basketball coaches
American men's basketball players
Basketball coaches from Ohio
Basketball players from Dayton, Ohio
Charlotte 49ers men's basketball coaches
Charlotte Hornets assistant coaches
Charlotte Hornets announcers
College basketball announcers in the United States
Kentucky Colonels draft picks
Kentucky Colonels players
Kentucky Wildcats men's basketball players
Shooting guards